Air Vice-Marshal Leslie William Cannon,  (9 April 1904 – 27 January 1986) was a senior Royal Air Force officer. He served as Commander-in-Chief of the Royal Pakistan Air Force from 1952 to 1955.

Military career
Cannon enlisted in the Royal Air Force (RAF) in the second entry of aircraft apprentices in 1920, and was commissioned as a pilot in 1925.

From 1948 until late 1949, Cannon was Assistant Commandant and then Commandant of the RAF Staff College, Andover.

He served as a Flight Commander in No. 60 Squadron RAF and then Officer Commanding No. 5 Squadron RAF on the North-West Frontier of India in the 1930s. Eventually attaining the rank of air vice-marshal (the first apprentice to achieve air rank), he served as Commander-in-Chief of the Royal Pakistan Air Force from 7 May 1951 to 19 June 1955.

References
PAF s' Chief of Air Staffs
Air of Authority – A History of RAF Organisation – Air Vice Marshal L W Cannon

|-

|-
 

1904 births
1958 deaths
Chiefs of Air Staff, Pakistan
Commanders of the Order of the British Empire
Companions of the Order of the Bath
Pakistan Air Force air marshals
Recipients of the Silver Star
Royal Air Force air marshals
Royal Air Force personnel of World War II
Trenchard Brats
British expatriates in Pakistan